"Beast of Burden" is a song by the English rock band the Rolling Stones, featured on the 1978 album Some Girls. In 2004, Rolling Stone magazine ranked the song  on their list of "The 500 Greatest Songs of All Time".

Background
A "beast of burden" is an animal, usually domesticated, that labors for the benefit of man, such as an ox or horse. The music and some lyrics were primarily written by Keith Richards. In the liner notes to the 1993 compilation disc Jump Back, Richards said "Beast of Burden" "was another one where Mick (Jagger) just filled in the verses. With the Stones, you take a long song, play it and see if there are any takers. Sometimes they ignore it, sometimes they grab it and record it. After all the faster numbers of Some Girls, everybody settled down and enjoyed the slow one."

In those same notes, Jagger says, "Lyrically, this wasn't particularly heartfelt in a personal way. It's a soul begging song, an attitude song. It was one of those where you get one melodic lick, break it down and work it up; there are two parts here which are basically the same." The song can be seen as allegorical, with Richards saying in 2003, "When I returned to the fold after closing down the laboratory [referring to his drug problems throughout the 1970s], I came back into the studio with Mick... to say, 'Thanks, man, for shouldering the burden' - that's why I wrote 'Beast of Burden' for him, I realise in retrospect."

"Beast of Burden" was recorded from October–December 1977. Although basic lyrics were written before the Stones entered the studio, many of the lyrics on the recording were improvised by Jagger to fit with the smooth running guitars of Richards and Ronnie Wood. Characteristically, Richards and Wood trade off rolling, fluid licks. Neither is really playing lead or rhythm guitar; they both slip in and out, one playing high while the other is low. The song is another famed Some Girls song that features each band member playing his respective instrument without any outside performers; both Richards and Wood play acoustic and electric guitars, with Wood performing the solo.  Ultimate Classic Rock critic Michael Gallucci said of Charlie Watts' drumming that "he locks into a groove immediately after the great opening guitar riff, giving the mid-tempo song a worthy backbeat to carry it through to the end," also saying that it is a "typically subtle, but absolutely brilliant, performance."

Personnel
 Mick Jagger – lead and backing vocals
 Keith Richards – electric guitar, backing vocals
 Ronnie Wood – electric guitar, acoustic guitar
 Bill Wyman – bass guitar
 Charlie Watts – drums

Release and aftermath
The song was released as the second single off the album.  Billboard praised its "seductive lyrics" and "catchy r&b flavor."  Cash Box said it is "a slow but perky ballad" with "tasty guitar licks."  Record World said it "should be equally endearing to both their new and old audiences" as "Miss You."

A live version was recorded during their 1981 American Tour and was released as a B-side to "Going to a Go-Go", as well as being reissued on Rarities 1971-2003 in 2005. Another live version was recorded during their 2002-2003 Licks Tour which was released on Live Licks. The single edit of "Beast of Burden" was included on the compilation albums Sucking in the Seventies, Rewind (1971–1984), Jump Back, Forty Licks and GRRR! A 5:20 version of the song with extra lyrics circulates among collectors. It was taken from the eight-track mix of Some Girls, which features significant differences from all other versions of the album. In 1983, the song was featured in Christine.

Charts

Certifications

Bette Midler version

In 1984, the song was covered by Bette Midler. Her version, which reached  on the Billboard Hot 100, modified several lines of lyric (for example, changing "Pretty, pretty, girls" to "my little sister is a pretty, pretty girl"). The track appeared on Midler's No Frills album.

Cash Box said that "Midler appropriately switches from sensitive to sassy vocal delivery" and that "the production is faithful to the original."

A music video was made for this version that started out with Midler and Mick Jagger talking in her dressing room before she comes out and performs the song with him on stage. As the song ends someone throws a pie at Jagger, and Midler laughs at it until she gets hit with a pie herself. The video ends with a picture of both of them covered in pie in a newspaper with the headline "Just desserts".

Track listing 
7" Single
 Beast of Burden 3:48
 Come Back, Jimmy Dean 3:51

Charts

Weekly charts

Year-end charts

Notes

The Rolling Stones songs
1978 singles
1984 singles
Atlantic Records singles
Bette Midler songs
Songs written by Jagger–Richards
Song recordings produced by Jagger–Richards
1978 songs
Blues rock songs
Rock ballads
Songs containing the I–V-vi-IV progression
1970s ballads
British soul songs
Soul ballads